A.S. Sancolombano Calcio is an Italian football club based in San Colombano al Lambro, Lombardy. Currently it plays in Italy's Serie D.

History

Foundation 
The club was founded in 1970.

Serie D 
In the season 2012–13 the team was promoted from Eccellenza Lombardy/B to Serie D.

Colors and badge 
The team's color is red.

References

External links
Official website 

Football clubs in Italy
Association football clubs established in 1970
Football clubs in Lombardy
1970 establishments in Italy